Huehue Acamapichtli (Ācamāpichtli [aːkamaːˈpit͡ʃt͡ɬi] = "Handful of reeds") was a king (Nahuatl: tlatoani) of Culhuacán.

He was a son — and successor — of King Coxcoxtli and his wife.

His sister was Atotoztli I of Culhuacán — mother of tlatoani of Tenochtitlan, named also Acamapichtli.

Diego Durán, Fernando Alvarado Tezozómoc and Fernando de Alva Cortés Ixtlilxochitl mentioned that Huehue Acamapichtli occupied the throne of Culhuacán in 1324.

Sources 

Tlatoque